Jeyran Darreh (also Romanized as Jeyrān Darreh; also known as Jeyrān Daraq) is a village in Soluk Rural District, in the Central District of Hashtrud County, East Azerbaijan Province, Iran. At the 2006 census, its population was 85, in 16 families.

References 

Towns and villages in Hashtrud County